The Comic Book Collecting Association, or CBCA, is an organization dedicated to promoting the hobby of comic book collecting. Its membership is composed of collectors, dealers, and other comic book enthusiasts. It is modeled after other hobbyist organizations such as the American Philatelic Society and the Universal Autograph Collectors Club. The CBCA is a not-for-profit corporation registered in the State of California.

History
The Comic Book Collecting Association was created in December 2009 by the members of another organization, now defunct, the Network of Disclosure (NOD). The Network of Disclosure was a group whose members pledged to disclose any restoration or enhancement on comic books that they sold. The members of NOD voted on December 12, 2009, to change the name and mission statement of the organization to reflect the much broader goal of promoting education, fellowship, and ethics within the hobby. As a result, the Network of Disclosure ceased to exist and the Comic Book Collecting Association was created. The CBCA was publicly announced on February 22, 2010, on several comic book-related websites and publications. The organization has members in the United States and in several other countries.

Aims
The Comic Book Collecting Association is a non-profit international organization made up of comic book enthusiasts who share an appreciation for the history, artistic merit, and significance of the comic book medium as an important element of popular culture.  The aim of the CBCA is to promote the comic book art form and hobby of comic book collecting for people of all ages by encouraging fellowship among comic book enthusiasts, providing information and education to the public, and helping to facilitate the buying, selling, and trading of comic books and related material.

Current and past Directors and Officers
Directors:
 Patrick Beam (2009–present)
 Mike Greenwood (2009–present)
 Michael McMurray (2009–present)
 Brent Moeshlin (2009–present)
 Michael Naiman (2009–2010)
 Steve Zarelli (2010–present)

President:
 Marnin Rosenberg (2009–2010)
 Jeffrey Shanks (2010–present)

Vice President:
 Jeffrey Shanks (2009–2010)

Secretary:
 Mitch Jordan (2009–2010)

Treasurer:
 Rob Kruezer (2009–2010)

Marketing Director
 Mark Zaid (2010–Present)

Legal Counsel
 Josh Entin (2009–2010)

Events
On July 25, 2009, the NOD was one of the sponsors of a presentation made at the San Diego Comic-Con called "From Cave Art To Superheroes: Comic Books & Social Commentary".  This presentation was made by Mark Zaid.

On June 2, 2010, Chris A. Tsuda of San Francisco, California, was the Grand Prize winner of the first CBCA Amateur Art Contest.

On August 27, 2010, the CBCA coordinated a trip to view the original artwork of Amazing Fantasy #15 and some of the comics housed in the collection of the Library of Congress.

Publications
The CBCA publishes a newsletter, Comic Book Quarterly, four times a year. It contains updates on the organization, articles, market reports, and material related to the hobby of comic book collecting.

Notes
On February 22, 2010, Mark Zaid, the Marketing Director of the CBCA, was quoted in an Associated Press article about the sale of a copy of Action Comics #1.

References

External links
Comic Book Collecting Association

Comic book collecting
Nonprofit hobbyist organizations based in the United States